The battle for Hill 3234 was a successful defensive battle fought by the 345th Independent Guards Airborne Regiment, Soviet Airborne Troops, in Afghanistan against a force of some 250 Mujahideen rebels who were supported by several Pakistani mercenaries in early January 1988. Two of the soldiers killed, Vyacheslav Aleksandrov and Andrey Melnikov, were posthumously awarded the Gold Star of the Hero of the Soviet Union. All of the paratroopers in this battle were given the Order of the Red Banner and Order of the Red Star.

Background
In November 1987, the Soviet 40th Army under General Boris Gromov began Operation Magistral to open the road from Gardez to Khost near the Pakistani border. Khost had been cut off for months by mujahideen led by Jalaluddin Haqqani and had to be resupplied by air. Negotiations were undertaken with the local Jadran tribe as well as with Haqqani. These talks did not succeed, mostly due to the unshakable resolution of Haqqani who wanted to control the city as the core of his independent Afghan state and as a base for future incursions deeper into the country. Before the operation, there was also a widespread propaganda campaign, with a special radio station set up, calling on the Jadran people to cease supporting the mujahideen and leave the combat areas.

Even during the negotiations, a detailed operation plan was formed and the required forces put on alert. After talks finally collapsed, the offensive was set in motion. The operation involved the 108th and 201st Motor Rifle Divisions, as well as the 103rd Guards Airborne Division, the 345th Independent Guards Airborne Regiment, and the 56th Separate Air Assault Brigade. They were supported by five infantry divisions and a tank division of the Afghan government. Prior intelligence and aerial reconnaissance had identified a number of important fortified rebel held sites on the road between Kabul and Khost. Fortifications included a minefield with mines about 3 km deep, 10 BM-21 rocket launchers, numerous anti-aircraft guns and DShK heavy machine gun positions, recoilless guns, mortars, and RPGs. The rebels were well prepared for defense and made the main pass and the surrounding hills impenetrable. The Soviet command was aware that a direct attack would be suicidal and therefore decided to trick the rebels into revealing their positions. On 28 October 1987, a feint landing was made in the areas controlled by the mujahideen, throwing dressed up mannequins from the air. Due to this, a reconnaissance aircraft was able to transmit the coordinates of rebel positions to the air force and after several air strikes and a four-hour-long artillery barrage, Operation Magistral began.

Battle
As the operation went on, Soviet commanders wanted to secure the entire section of the road from Gardez to Khost. The 39 man company landed on the hilltop on 7 January 1988, tasked with creating and holding a hilltop strong point from which to observe and control a long section of the road beneath and thus secure it for the safe passage of convoys.

Shortly after landing, the airborne troopers, who were well trained and experienced in Afghan conditions, started to take up positions which covered both the road and the uphill passages. Just as they had dug in, the mujahideen began their attack at 3:30 PM local time. The first wave included the use of recoilless guns and RPGs. After which, Soviet artillery replied, directed by the commander of the first platoon, Lt. Viktor Gagarin, via a radio. When rebel fire decreased, it was reasoned that it was the beginning of an infantry assault.

The airborne troopers were attacked by a coordinated and well-armed force of between 200 and 250 mujahideen from two directions, indicating that the assailants may have been assisted by rebels trained in Pakistan. During the ensuing battle, the Soviet unit remained in communication with headquarters and received support from the command of the of 40th Army in terms of artillery support, ammunition, reinforcements, and the eventual helicopter evacuation of the wounded.

The first attack on 7 January was followed by eleven more attacks until just before dawn on 8 January when the mujahideen retreated after suffering severe casualties, leaving Hill 3234 in the hands of the Soviet paratroopers. The exhausted and mostly wounded Soviets were nearly out of ammunition but continued to occupy the hill until the last convoy passed through the road below. These attacks continued until the following morning, at which point the Soviets were almost out of ammunition, had lost six paratroopers, and had another 28 wounded, 9 of them gravely.

Casualties

Soviet Union
The Soviet forces lost (KIA) 6 men out of 39. The vast majority of the unit became casualties, with 28 of the remaining 33 being wounded in action. Two of the soldiers killed, Vyacheslav Alexandrovich Alexandrov and Andrey Alexandrovich Melnikov, were posthumously awarded the golden star of the Hero of the Soviet Union. All of the paratroopers in this battle were given the Order of the Red Banner and Order of the Red Star.

Mujahideen
According to the Soviet estimates, the mujahideen lost over 200 men. The Mujahideen wore black uniforms with rectangular black-yellow-red stripes. It was alleged by several sources that there were some mercenaries from Pakistan who were coordinating the attack.

See also

The 9th Company, a 2005 Russian war film based on the battle that took place at Elevation 3234.
 Battle of Wanat

Notes

Hill 3234
Hill 3234
Hill 3234
History of Khost Province
Last stands
1988 in Afghanistan
Operations involving Pakistani special forces
Pakistan–Soviet Union relations
January 1988 events
Hill 3234
Massacres in Afghanistan